The Psalterium Sinaiticum (scholarly abbreviations: Psa or Ps. sin.) is a 209-folio Glagolitic Old Church Slavonic canon manuscript, the earliest Slavic psalter, dated to the 11th century. The manuscript was found in Saint Catherine's Monastery in Egypt, after which it was named and where it remains to this day.

Discovery 
The major part of the psalter (177 folios) was discovered in 1850 by the Russian archimandrite Porphyrius Uspensky (Sin. slav. 38/O), and additional 32 folios with the exact continuation (Ps. 138-150 and the 14 canticles) turned up in 1968 (Sin. slav. 2/N).

Editions 
It was published by L. Geitler (Psalterium. Glagolski spomenik manastria Siani brda; Zagreb 1883), S.N. Severjanov (Sinajskaja psaltyr'. Glagoličeskij pamjatnik XI veka. Prigotovil k pečati Sergej Sever'janov; Saint Petersburg 1922, transcribed to Cyrillic; reprinted in Graz in 1954) and by Moshe Altbauer in 1971, in a facsimile reproduction (Sinajski psaltir, glagolski rakopis od XI. vek od manastirot Sv. Katerina na Sinaj, MANU, Skopje 1971). The manuscript is also extensively discussed with facsimile reproductions in Ioannis C. Tarnanidis: The Slavonic Manuscripts Discovered in 1975 at. St. Catherine's Monastery on Mount Sinai (Thessaloniki 1988).

Linguistic analysis 
Paleographic and linguistic analysis shows that the writing of some letters is very inconsistent. Therefore, it is assumed that several scribes worked on the manuscript. Especially inconsistent is the writing of yers and nasal vowels, and very obvious is the tendency of the vocalization of jers and the omission of epenthetic l.

See also

 List of Glagolitic manuscripts

References

Source 

Sinaiticum
11th-century biblical manuscripts
Cyrillo-Methodian studies
Old Church Slavonic canon
Church Slavonic manuscripts